Jason Yuan (born 1 February 1942) is a Taiwanese politician and diplomat. He was the Secretary-General of the National Security Council in 2012–2014.

ROC Representative to the United States
Yuan was the chief representative of the Republic of China to the United States as the head of the Taipei Economic and Cultural Representative Office in Washington, DC. He was appointed to that position in July 2008 by President Ma Ying-jeou to succeed Joseph Wu, who had been appointed by the previous administration.

See also
Foreign relations of the Republic of China
Republic of China – United States relations

References

Living people
Kuomintang politicians in Taiwan
1942 births
Republic of China politicians from Guizhou
Taiwanese people from Guizhou
Ambassadors of the Republic of China to Panama
Representatives of Taiwan to Canada
Representatives of Taiwan to the United States